Jalan Banting–Semenyih or Jalan Bangi, Federal Route 31 (formerly Selangor state route B18), is a federal road in Selangor, Malaysia. The 45.8 km (28.5 mi) road connects Teluk Datok, Kuala Langat in the west to Semenyih, Hulu Langat in the east.

The Kilometre Zero is located at Semenyih.

In 2011, the road was gazetted as the federal road by JKR as Federal Route 31.

At most sections, the Federal Route 31 was built under the JKR R5 road standard, with a speed limit of 90 km/h.

List of junctions

References

Malaysian Federal Roads
Roads in Selangor